South Croydon railway station is in the London Borough of Croydon in south London, in Travelcard Zone 5.

The station is managed by Southern, and the station is served by both Southern and Thameslink services.

History
Originally South Croydon was a terminus next to the through lines of the Brighton Line but without any platforms on them, the end of a  extension of the local lines from New Croydon, opened by the London Brighton and South Coast Railway on 1 September 1865. The aim was to provide more space for reversing local trains than could be afforded at busy New Croydon. The rapid growth of the town in this area may also have been a factor.

In 1894 the railway obtained authority to extend the local lines to Coulsdon, where they connected with the new Quarry line. The station was rebuilt as a through station with platform faces on all lines prior to the opening of the line in November 1899.

Platforms 

South Croydon has five platforms connected by a narrow subway.

Platforms 1 and 2 are rarely used as fast Southern services from London Victoria to Brighton, Thameslink services and Gatwick Express, and these services do not call.

Platform 3 is used by up trains to London Bridge, Bedford and London Victoria in the peak hours

Platform 4 is used by services that do not call, heading southbound, and some Thameslink services in both directions.

Platform 5 is used by down trains to Caterham, Tattenham Corner and Three Bridges

Ticket gates became operational in April 2009.

Services 
Off-peak, services at South Croydon are operated by Southern using  EMUs, and Thameslink using Class 700 EMUs.

The typical off-peak service in trains per hour is:
 2 tph to Bedford via London Bridge,
 2 tph to Three Bridges via Redhill

On Sundays, there is a half-hourly service between London Bridge and Caterham only. Passengers for Tattenham Corner have to change at Purley.

In December 2022, Thameslink off peak services commenced at South Croydon, with a half hourly service to Three Bridges and Bedford.

Connections
London Buses route 455 serves the station.

References

External links 

Railway stations in the London Borough of Croydon
Former London, Brighton and South Coast Railway stations
Railway stations in Great Britain opened in 1865
Railway stations served by Govia Thameslink Railway